Modul University Vienna (short MU Vienna) is a private university established in 2007 in Vienna, Austria, that focuses on social and economic development. In particular, it focuses on the areas of tourism, new media information technology, sustainability, business management, and public governance.

History

Foundation and vision 
MU Vienna was founded by the Vienna Chamber of Commerce and Industry and the Saudi-Austrian businessman Mohamed Bin Issa Al Jaber, and built with the support of the City of Vienna and the Vienna Tourist Board. The aim of the founders was to offer students internationally oriented, hands-on studies in the areas of tourism research, information technology, and public administration by making use of the active role of Vienna in European city tourism. Karl Wöber, who had previously taught at the Vienna University of Economics and Business in the field of tourism, was appointed founding president.

In 2012, the Vienna Chamber of Commerce and Industry assumed sole ownership and laid the foundation for the successful development of the university in the fields of business and tourism. Within the first ten years, three bachelor and four master programs were accredited. A PhD program was accredited in 2012.

Since January 2013, MU Vienna has been a member of the European Universities Consortium (EUC), a group of higher education institutions that promotes English-taught bachelor's programs in Europe. The international orientation of Modul University Vienna is not only manifested by an international focus on teaching and research, but also through the internationality of its locations. Study programs are not only offered in Vienna, but also in Dubai (UAE) since 2016 and in Nanjing (PR China) since 2017.

Modul University Vienna bases its research priorities on the principles of sustainability, economics, and innovation. The foreground maintains the overriding goal of creating benefits for society. The various scientific disciplines represented at Modul University Vienna are guided by these principles, which coincide with integral components of the curricula of all study programs. Their relevance is also reflected in the daily work of staff and students.

Additionally, the university strives for an integrated academic education, which is understood as an interweaving of decision-making competences, based on a combination of methodical problem solving and social learning. The inclusion and promotion of the following values of education was decided by the University Senate on 16 January 2012:

 Knowledge, Creativity, and Innovation: Challenge what the society takes for granted and embrace change'.
 Personal Integrity: '''Support the principles of equality and justice'.
 Mutual Respect: Value diversity and humanity'.
 Responsibility and Stewardship: '''Serve as ambassadors of sustainable and responsible living'.

These values can be seen displayed on the façade of the university building in the 12 most frequently spoken languages in the world.

In 2015, Modul University Vienna founded Modul University Technology GmbH, an R&D spin-off with a research focus on multimedia applications, interactive TV, and automated knowledge extraction processes.

In 2020, the Vienna Chamber of Commerce and Industry sold 90% of its shares to the British entrepreneur Suresh Sivagnanam (*1970), founder of vdoc, an online medical advice and care platform that offers its members rapid access to medical facilities worldwide.

The university was conceived and named "Modul University Vienna" by employees of the Modul Tourism College, a tertiary education school for hotel management and gastronomy also founded by the Vienna Chamber of Commerce and Industry in 1908. The name Modul comes from the honeycomb structure of the Modul Tourism College, in which both the school and the adjacent hotel of the same name consist of octagonal, connected "modules". The school and hotel are located in the 19th district (Döbling) and were designed and built between 1973 and 1975. In the meantime, the hotel has been closed. Attending the Modul Tourism College is not a prerequisite for admission to Modul University Vienna.

Accreditation 
Modul University Vienna was accredited on July 30, 2007, by the Austrian Accreditation Council, which carried out the state recognition of private universities on behalf of the Ministry of Science and started operations in fall 2007. In 2014 the university was first reaccredited by the Agency for Quality Assurance and Accreditation Austria, which was founded on March 1, 2011, on the basis of the University Quality Assurance Act (HS-QSG) as part of a fundamental redesign of the system of external quality assurance in Austria. In addition, the study programs for tourism offered by MU have been certified by the certification scheme Ted.Qual of the United Nations World Tourism Organization (UNWTO) since 2012.

Sustainability 
Sustainability is one of the basic principles of Modul University Vienna and is an essential component of both its educational content and research agenda. The ongoing operation of the university enables the minimization of negative impacts on the environmental system through numerous measures. The university has a solar energy system, a pellet heating system, and a waste management system, as well as several measures to promote a sustainable way of thinking and living among its students and staff. A Sustainability Committee, appointed by the University Senate, promotes continuous communication about its goals and measures to further improve the awareness of sustainability among students, staff, suppliers, and partners.

University bodies 
The university is managed by a collegial body consisting of the rector, the vice-rector, and the managing director. The University Council supports the development of Modul University Vienna and consists of four representatives of the owners, two representatives of the industry, and two representatives of other universities.  The University Senate consists of 23 members and elects the members of various committees and proposes candidates for the offices of rector and vice-rector.

Academic units 
Modul University Vienna consists of four scientific departments and one research institute:

 Department of Sustainability, Governance, and Methods (Head: Prof. Sabine Sedlacek)
 Department of Tourism and Service Management (Head: Prof. Astrid Dickinger)
 Department of International Management (Head: Prof. Horst Treiblmaier)
 Department of Applied Data Science (interim management: Prof. Karl Wöber)
 Research Institute for New Media Technology (Head: Prof. Arno Scharl)

Study programs 
A total of 942 students were enrolled in the academic year 2018/19, 186 of them at Dubai and 89 at Nanjing. A special feature of the university is its particularly high proportion of international students (70%) and the diversity of its origins. Students came from 62 different countries in the academic year 2018/19.  In accordance with the instructions of the Agency for Quality Assurance and Accreditation Austria  and the Knowledge and Human Development Authority (KHDA) in Dubai, a teach-out of the studies offered in Dubai takes place and will be completed in 2023.

Modul University Vienna offers BBA, BSc, MSc, MBA, and PhD study programs in the fields of international management, service-oriented economy, tourism, sustainability, data management and analysis, and the design of innovative information systems. In addition to the core subjects, which must be completed as mandatory in the respective programs, in-depth subjects provide the opportunity to specialize in different areas of expertise. The range of offered courses includes the following study programs:

 Bachelor of Science (BSc) in International Management
 Bachelor of Science (BSc) in International Management with Professional Experience (in accreditation)

Both Bachelor of Science in International Management programs offer the following specializations: Entrepreneurship and Leadership, International Marketing, International Management.

 Bachelor of Science (BSc) in Applied Data Science (in accreditation)
 Bachelor of Business Administration (BBA) in Tourism and Hospitality Management

The Bachelor of Business Administration offers the following specializations: Tourism and Event Management, Hotel Management.

 Bachelor of Business Administration (BBA) in Tourism, Hotel Management and Operations
 Master of Science (MSc) in Sustainable Development, Management and Policy
 Master of Science (MSc) in International Tourism Management
 Master of Science (MSc) in Management

All Master of Science programs offer the following specializations: Digital Marketing, Entrepreneurship, Innovation and Leadership, Innovation and Experience Design for Tourism, Real Estate Management, Sustainable Management and Policy, and Tourism and Services Management.

 Master of Business Administration (MBA)

The Master of Business Administration offers the following specializations: Digital Marketing, Entrepreneurship, Innovation and Leadership, Innovation and Experience Design for Tourism, Real Estate Management, and Sustainable Management and Policy.

 Doctor of Philosophy (PhD) in Business and Socioeconomic Sciences

At the Dubai campus:

 Bachelor of Science (BSc) in International Management
 Bachelor of Business Administration (BBA) in Tourism and Hospitality Management
 Master of Science (MSc) in Sustainable Development, Management and Policy
 Master of Business Administration (MBA)

At the Nanjing campus:

 Bachelor of Business Administration (BBA) in Tourism and Hospitality Management.

All study programs are offered exclusively in English. Modul University Vienna maintains exchange programs for its students with 21 partner universities worldwide.

Research

Modul University Vienna is characterized by a high level of commitment to basic and applied research. The research topics are in the fields of economics, social sciences, and information science and deal with both current and future-oriented research questions. The research-led teaching approach of Modul University Vienna is reflected in the discussion of current research projects in teaching and the active involvement of students in research projects. In addition, Modul University Vienna is dedicated to supporting young researchers, especially since the accreditation of the doctoral program in business and socioeconomic sciences in 2012. From 2007 to 2017, Modul University Vienna faculty has published 670 scientific articles and 600 conference contributions, as well as completed 68 national and international research projects.

In 2015, Modul University Vienna founded Modul University Technology GmbH, an R&D spin-off with a research focus on multimedia applications, interactive TV, and automated knowledge extraction processes.

Research focus of the faculty:  

 Analysis of large amounts of data (Big Data), knowledge extraction, and information diffusion
 Environmental communication with a focus on climate change
 Energy financing and system prices
 Digital marketing
 Sustainable finances, fund management, and asset pricing
 Impact of blockchain / distributed ledger technology
 Sustainable tourism and regional development policy
 Governance for innovation and sustainable development
 Education for sustainable development
 Measuring living conditions and quality of life
 Degrowth
 Methods for analyzing empirical data
 Analysis of travel flows and leisure behavior
 Development and evaluation of information and decision support systems
 Innovation and Design Thinking
 Market research and analysis of consumer behavior

Awards and rankings

The university has repeatedly been recognized for its research achievements and its focus on sustainability. In 2018 and 2020, Modul University Vienna was ranked among the top 25 universities in the world in the U-Multirank University Ranking in the category "most frequently cited publications".  In 2012, Modul University Vienna received the Austrian National Award for Sustainability for its project "Promotion of Sustainable Stakeholder Initiatives" in the field of structural anchoring. In 2016, Modul University Vienna followed up with two awards for its work in the field of education on sustainability: second place for the project "SusToGo - Sustainability to go" in the category "Student Initiatives" and for the project "DecarboNet" in the category "Communication and Decision Making".

Talents squared 
In 2018, a competence center for company founders (start-up hub) was established at Modul University Vienna. The competence center combines the teaching and research competence at the university with the local and regional developing start-up scene. The focus on service management and the interdisciplinary innovation research are of particular importance for the development of the start-up ecosystem. The Talents Squared Competence Center serves as an accelerator for selected start-ups in the food & beverage, hospitality, and service industry sectors to promote innovative ideas and products to market maturity.

Partners

MU Vienna maintains a number of co-operations with academic and industry partners, as well as organizations around the world. Modul University Vienna's maintains study exchange agreements with the following partner institutions:

Asia

Boğaziçi University (Turkey), Hong Kong Polytechnic University (Hong Kong SAR), Taylor's University (Malaysia), City University of Macau (Macau SAR)

Modul University is the first international partner of AdmitAll, a Philippine-based education technology company.

Europe

Dublin Institute of Technology (Ireland), NHTV Breda University of Applied Sciences (The Netherlands), University of Southern Denmark (Denmark), University of Surrey (UK), La Rochelle Business School (France), Ramon Llull University (Spain), Cologne Business School (Germany), University of Barcelona (Spain),  University of West London (UK), University of Surrey (UK), ISAG – European Business School (Portugal).

North and South America

San Francisco State University (USA), Temple University (USA), Virginia Tech (USA), Universidad Anáhuac Mayab (Mexico), University of Central Florida (USA), University of Florida (USA), UIDE Universidad Internacional del Ecuador (Ecuador)

Campus life

Modul University Vienna is situated on Kahlenberg, a mountain located in the 19th district of Vienna, Austria (Döbling). Kahlenberg lies in the Wienerwald (Vienna forest) and is one of the most popular destinations for day-trips from Vienna, offering a view over the entire city. Student accommodation arranged by MU Vienna is available in the 19th and 20th districts of Vienna. Many students live in other parts of Vienna or in their home cities and countries and commute to the campus. Kahlenberg can be reached by car or by bus (Bus line 38A) via the Höhenstraße, part of which is cobblestone.

Extracurricular activities

In accordance with the fundamental educational values of the university, Modul University Vienna has created the MU Cares Intercultural Certificate Program to encourage students to work for society alongside their studies.  The university offers students the opportunity to participate in charitable and social events at the university or on their own initiative off campus. It encourages and supports its students in their search for intercultural experience and social work. Upon completion of their studies at Modul University Vienna, students who can demonstrate extracurricular activities in line with MU Care's vision receive a certificate from the university as a supplement to their diploma. In addition to this program, various student groups such as the Hotel Club, the Football Club, the Entrepreneurs Club, or the Movie Club contribute to student life.  Every year, the university organizes an International Day, a public event at the university where students present their countries and their cultural background. The net proceeds of this event are donated to a charitable cause.

Modul career

Since April 2010, the networking and career service platform Modul Career has been available to students and alumni of Modul University Vienna and the Tourism College Modul. Modul Career offers career planning and career development services for the students and graduates of both educational institutions. Its aim is to assist students with finding an internship as well as to support them in career planning and development. Modul Career assists over 7,000 alumni of both institutions.

Awards

Honorary senators 

 Brigitte Jank (* 1951), As founding chairperson of the University Council, she supported the development of the university and promoted the vision of a holistic, value-oriented education.
 Mohamed Bin Issa Al Jaber (* 1959), sponsor of Modul University Vienna, who awarded scholarships to numerous students during the founding phase.

Ring bearers 

 Erich Auerbäck (* 1947), chairman of the project team responsible for the planning and founding of the university in 2007.

Professorships 

 Graziano Ceddia
 Dimitris Christopoulos
 Astrid Dickinger
 Serdar Durmusoglu
 Jörg Finsinger
 Marion Garaus
 Harvey Goldstein
 Ulrich Gunter
 Dagmar Lund-Durlacher
 Gunther Maier
 Josef Mazanec
 Irem Önder
 Ivo Ponocny
 Margarethe Rammerstorfer
 Arno Scharl
 Sabine Sedlacek
 Egon Smeral
 Edith M. Szivas
 Horst Treiblmaier
 Karl Wöber
 Andreas Zins

References

External links
 Official Website
Modul Technology GmbH
Virtual campus tour – 360°
Modul University Dubai

Universities and colleges in Vienna
Business schools in Austria
Private universities and colleges in Austria
Educational institutions established in 2007
2007 establishments in Austria